Jason Michael Paul is an American concert producer, promoter, and entrepreneur. His production company, "Jason Michael Paul Productions", produced “Dear Friends”, PLAY! A Video Game Symphony, and Nintendo's Legend of Zelda: Symphony of the Goddesses.

References

Further reading

External links
Official website

Living people
American businesspeople
Year of birth missing (living people)